Cargo is a Romanian heavy metal band from Timișoara.

Biography

Cargo was formed by Adrian Bărar in 1985, after he quit the new wave band Autostop. The original line-up was Tavi Iepan (guitar), Carol Bleich (drums), Tiberiu Gajdo (bass), Dinel Tollea (keyboards) and Adrian Bărar (guitar, vocals).

In 1988, the group recruited Ovidiu Ioncu "Kempes" as their new vocalist. He would stay with the band for the next 15 years, lending his voice to 4 full-length albums. During these years, Cargo toured the country extensively, playing numerous festivals, and receiving radio airplay, becoming the most well-known heavy metal band in the country.

In 2003, Kempes decided to leave the band, and emigrate to Australia, so the vocal duties were taken over by guitarist Adrian Igrișan. After considering to organize auditions for a new vocalist, they finally decided on leaving Igrișan to handle both guitar and vocals. With this line-up they recorded their 5th album, Spiritus Sanctus, which was released the same year. The power ballad "Dacă ploaia s-ar opri" received massive airplay on both radio and television, with Cargo becoming a household name in Romania. It is still one of the most commonly played tracks in Romanian media.

The band continues to play live, often being invited to play at large open-air events.

Members

 Adrian Igrișan (vocals / guitar)
 Octavian Pilan (drums)
 Ionut Cârjă (keyboards)
 Alin Achim (bass guitar)
 Richard Pulpa "Godzilla" ("roadie")
 Cosmin Nicoară – Manager

Former members

 Adrian Bărar (guitar / vocals)
 Ovidiu Ioncu "Kempes" (vocals)
 Florin "Barbie" Barbu (bass guitar, backing vocals)
 Ramon Radosav (bass guitar, violin)
 Carol Bleich (drums)
 Octavian Iepan (guitar)
 Tibi Gajdo (guitar)
 Dinel Tollea (keyboards)
 Nae Ionel Tarnotzi
 Leo Iorga (vocals)
 Peter Kocsef (drums)
 Tibi Bako (bass guitar)
 Mircea Nedelcu (vocals)
 Raul Dudnic (bass guitar)
 Adrian Popescu (guitar)
 Cristian Pup (keyboards)

Discography

Albums
 Povestiri din gară (Tales from a Train Station) – 1992
 Destin (Destiny) – 1995
 Colinde și obiceiuri de iarnă (Carols and Winter Customs) 1996, re-released with the Teofora choir in 1999
 Ziua vrăjitoarelor (Day of the Witches) – 1998
 Colinde (Christmas Carols) – 2000
 Spiritus Sanctus – 2003
 Cargo XXII (Best Of) – 2007
 Vinyl – (Live) 2016

Singles and other releases
 Brigadierii (The Rangers) – 1989
 Buletin de știri (Newsflash) – 1989
 Doi prieteni/Ana (Two friends/Ana) – 1990
 Capra/Lui – on Darul Magilor 1 Compilation – 1995
 Clasa muncitoare & Batacanda (The Working Class & Batacanda) – on Unplugged Romania compilation – 1996
 Steaua & Urare/Bucuria Crăciunului (The Star & Good Wish/The Joy of Christmas) – on Darul Magilor 3 Compilation – 1997
 Cântecul Paștelui (Easter Song) – 1998, released as a video
 Bagă-ți mințile-n cap (Get Serious) – maxi-single – 2000
 Mama (Mother) – 2000, released as a video
 Cargo Box Set – includes the albums Povestiri din gară, Destin and Ziua Vrăjitoarelor
 Dacă ploaia s-ar opri (If the Rain Would Stop) – 2003, released as a video
 Nu pot trăi fără tine (I Can't Live Without You) – 2004, released as a video

Notes

References

External links

Cargo – official site (Romanian)

Romanian heavy metal musical groups
Musical groups established in 1985
1985 establishments in Romania